Andries Ulderink (born 30 July 1969) is a Dutch association football coach and a former player. He coached Dutch professional and amateur teams. Since 2020, he works as the assistant coach at Twente.

Football career
Ulderink was a footballer at VV Reünie and HSC '21. His position was forward.

Manager
Ulderink started coaching at AZSV. He then continued to SC Varsseveld, SV DCS, and Rohda Raalte. His first manager gig at a professional team was assistant coach at De Graafschap. He returned to Rohda Raalte, assisted again De Graafschap, lead the youth department at De Graafschap, and coached Be Quick '28. His first main coach position at a professional team was for Go Ahead Eagles, followed by De Graafschap, AGOVV, scout at Ajax, Jong Ajax, and assistant at Reading (2016–2018). In 2018, he became the manager of Ajax Cape Town. In February 2020, Ulderink stepped back from the position because he declared his solidarity with technical director Hans Vonk, who was in conflict with the club chairman. He became assistant coach to Ron Jans at Twente in June 2020.

References

1969 births
Dutch footballers
Ajax Cape Town F.C. managers
De Graafschap managers
AGOVV Apeldoorn managers
AFC Ajax managers
Jong Ajax managers
Go Ahead Eagles managers
Be Quick '28 managers
Rohda Raalte managers
Sportspeople from Zwolle
Living people
Dutch football managers
Association football forwards
FC Twente non-playing staff
Eerste Divisie managers
Dutch expatriate football managers
Expatriate soccer managers in South Africa
Dutch expatriate sportspeople in South Africa
HSC '21 players
Footballers from Overijssel